Revolutsionnaya Rossiya ( was an illegal newspaper published by the League of Socialist-Revolutionaries in imperial Russia from late 1900 (No. 1 dated 1900 actually appeared in January 1901). It was published in Geneva from January 1902 to December 1905 as an organ of the Socialist-Revolutionary Party. It went defunct in 1905.

References

1900 establishments in the Russian Empire
1905 disestablishments in Switzerland
Defunct magazines published in Russia
Defunct political magazines
Magazines disestablished in 1905
Magazines established in 1900
Magazines published in Geneva
Political magazines published in Russia
Russian-language magazines
Socialist magazines
Socialist Revolutionary Party